Barclay may refer to:

People 
 Barclay (surname)
 Clan Barclay

Places
 Barclay, Kansas
 Barclay, Maryland, a town in Queen Anne's County
 Barclay, Baltimore, Maryland, a neighborhood
 Barclay, Nevada, a town in Lincoln County
 Barclay, Texas

Business
 Barclay (record label), a French record label
 Barclay (cigarette), an American brand of cigarettes
 Barclays, a United Kingdom based bank
 Barclay Manufacturing Company (1922–1971), a toy manufacturer
 Barclay Mowlem, former Australian construction  company
 Andrew Barclay Sons & Company, a Scottish locomotive builder
 Jack Barclay Bentley, a Bentley dealership
 Barclay, a brand of liquor owned by Barton Brands

Education
 The Barclay School, a secondary school in Stevenage, UK
 Barclay College, a college in Haviland, Kansas

Other uses
 Operation Barclay, a World War II operation
 The Barclays, A golf tournament in New York City area

See also 
 Barclayville, the capital of Grand Kru County, Liberia
 Barkley (disambiguation)
 Berkeley (disambiguation)